Philip Noel Pettit  (born 1945) is an Irish  philosopher and political theorist. He is the Laurance S. Rockefeller University Professor of Politics and Human Values at Princeton University and also Distinguished University Professor of Philosophy at the Australian National University.

Education and career
Pettit was educated at Garbally College, the National University of Ireland, Maynooth (BA, LPh, MA) and Queen's University, Belfast (PhD).

He has been a lecturer at University College, Dublin, a research fellow at Trinity Hall, Cambridge, and professor at the University of Bradford. He was for many years professorial fellow in social and political theory at the Research School of Social Sciences, Australian National University before becoming a visiting professor of philosophy at Columbia University for five years, then moving to Princeton. 

He is the recipient of numerous honours, including an honorary doctorate from the National University of Ireland.
He was keynote speaker at Graduate Conference, University of Toronto.

He was elected a Fellow of the American Academy of Arts and Sciences in 2009, and a Corresponding Fellow of the British Academy in 2013.  He has also been a Guggenheim Fellow.

Philosophical work

Pettit defends a version of civic republicanism in political philosophy.  His book Republicanism: A Theory of Freedom and Government provided the underlying justification for political reforms in Spain under José Luis Rodríguez Zapatero.  Pettit detailed his relationship with Zapatero in his A Political Philosophy in Public Life: Civic Republicanism in Zapatero's Spain, co-authored with José Luis Martí.

Pettit holds that the lessons learned when thinking about problems in one area of philosophy often constitute ready-made solutions to problems faced in completely different areas.  Views he defends in philosophy of mind give rise to the solutions he offers to problems in metaphysics about the nature of free will, and to problems in the philosophy of the social sciences, and these in turn give rise to the solutions he provides to problems in moral philosophy and political philosophy. His corpus as a whole was the subject of a series of critical essays published in Common Minds: Themes from the Philosophy of Philip Pettit (Oxford University Press, 2007).

Affiliations and honours
Fellow of the American Academy of Arts and Sciences (2009)
Honorary member of the Royal Irish Academy (2010)
Corresponding Fellow of the British Academy (2013)
Fellow of the Academy of the Social Sciences in Australia (1987)
Member of the scientific committee of the Fundacion IDEAS
Companion of the Order of Australia (AC) in the 2017 Queen's Birthday Honours (Australia)

Selected bibliography

Books
The Concept of Structuralism: a Critical Analysis (1975)
Judging justice: an introduction to contemporary political philosophy (1980)
Rawls: 'A Theory of Justice' and its critics (1990) with Chandran Kukathas
The Common Mind; an essay on psychology, society and politics (1993)
Not Just Deserts. A Republican Theory of Criminal Justice with John Braithwaite
Republicanism: a theory of freedom and government (1997)
Three Methods of Ethics: a debate (1997) with Marcia Baron and Michael Slote
A Theory of Freedom: from psychology to the politics of agency (2001)
Rules, Reasons and Norms: selected essays (2002)
The Economy of Esteem: an essay on civil and political society (2004) with Geoffrey Brennan
Mind, Morality, and Explanation: Selected Collaborations (with Frank Jackson and Michael Smith) (Oxford University Press, 2004)
Made with Words: Hobbes on Language, Mind, and Politics (2007)
"Joining the Dots" in Common Minds: Themes from the Philosophy of Philip Pettit (2007) edited by Geoffrey Brennan, Robert E. Goodin, Frank Jackson and Michael Smith
A Political Philosophy in Public Life: Civic Republicanism in Zapatero's Spain (2010) with José Luis Martí
Group Agency: The Possibility, Design, and Status of Corporate Agents. (2011) with Christian List
On The People's Terms: A Republican Theory and Model of Democracy. (2012)
Just Freedom: A Moral Compass for a Complex World. (2015)
The Robust Demands of the Good: Ethics with Attachment, Virtue, and Respect. (2015)

Chapters in books

References

Further reading

External links
 Profile: Philip Pettit, princeton.edu; accessed 13 March 2015. 
 Pettit: Republican reflections on the 15-M movement, in Books and Ideas; accessed 13 March 2015.
 Eye to Eye: an interview with Pettit by Petri Koikkalainen and Sami Syrjämäki, academia.edu; accessed 13 March 2015.
 

1945 births
Date of birth missing (living people)
20th-century Irish philosophers
21st-century Irish philosophers
Australian ethicists
Australian philosophers
Australian political philosophers
Australian republicans
Consequentialists
Irish ethicists
Irish political philosophers
Irish republicans
Living people
People from County Galway
Alumni of St Patrick's College, Maynooth
Alumni of Queen's University Belfast
Political philosophers
Princeton University faculty
Fellows of Trinity Hall, Cambridge
Recipients of the Centenary Medal
Fellows of the Academy of the Social Sciences in Australia
Companions of the Order of Australia
Corresponding Fellows of the British Academy
People educated at Garbally College